Daniel Nicholas Patrick Samonas (born March 7, 1990) is a Canadian American actor known best for his roles as Dean Moriarty on Wizards of Waverly Place and as Toder on iCarly.

Background
Born in Toronto, Ontario, Samonas is of Greek, and Irish descent, and moved to Coral Springs, Florida with his family when he was 11.  There he did print modeling and became active in film.  He currently resides in Los Angeles, California.

Career
After moving to Florida when he was 11, Samonas became involved in print modeling and local theater.  His first lead role was in Ephraim, after which he served in several more films until his first television spot in Everybody Hates Chris. He returned to film and in 2006 was cast in the ABC pilot Enemies.  This was followed by appearances in Zoey 101, Hannah Montana as Josh and repeated appearances as the voice of Teo in Avatar: The Last Airbender.  In 2006 he was cast as 'Meat' in The Last Day of Summer.  In 2008, Samonas made an appearance on iCarly as Freddie's fencing rival Doug Toder and later appeared on Disney Channel's Wizards of Waverly Place as Alex's (Selena Gomez) boyfriend Dean.

Filmography

References

External links

 Official website

1990 births
American male child actors
Canadian emigrants to the United States
Canadian male child actors
Canadian male film actors
Canadian male television actors
Canadian people of Greek descent
Canadian people of Irish descent
Canadian male voice actors
Living people
Male actors from Toronto
People from Coral Springs, Florida